Izak Petrus van der Westhuizen (born 23 January 1986 in Kimberley) is a former South African rugby union player whose regular position was lock.

Career

Youth

Van Der Westhuizen represented Kimberley-based side  at the Under-18 Craven Week in 2004 and also represented them in the Under-20 competition later in the same year.

He represented them at Under-19 level in 2005 and at Under-21 level in 2006 and 2007.

Free State Cheetahs and Cheetahs

Van Der Westhuizen became a regular in the Free State's Vodacom Cup side, making a total of 30 appearances in this competition between 2007 and 2011.

In 2010, he was also included in the  squad for the 2010 Super 14 season.

Griffons

Edinburgh

At the conclusion of the 2012 Currie Cup Premier Division season, he joined Scottish Pro12 side Edinburgh on a two-year contract.

Despite an injury-plagued first season, where he made just 6 appearances, Van der Westhuizen recovered to become a regular for Edinburgh during the 2013–14 Pro 12 and 2013–14 Heineken Cup competitions, making a total of 29 appearances.

Eastern Province Kings

On 10 March 2014, Edinburgh announced that Van der Westhuizen would join the  prior to the 2014 Currie Cup Premier Division season on a three-year deal, subject to a medical. However, since Van der Westhuizen suffered three concussions since the start of 2014, a specialist advised that he should not play any rugby for six month to a year. He did not pass the medical at the Eastern Province Kings and the contract was subsequently cancelled.

External links

References

1986 births
Living people
Cheetahs (rugby union) players
Edinburgh Rugby players
Expatriate rugby union players in Scotland
Free State Cheetahs players
Griffons (rugby union) players
Rugby union locks
Rugby union players from Kimberley, Northern Cape
South African expatriate rugby union players
South African expatriate sportspeople in Scotland
South African rugby union coaches
South African rugby union players
University of the Free State alumni